The Editio Leonina or Leonine Edition is the edition of the works of Saint Thomas Aquinas originally sponsored by Pope Leo XIII in 1879.

The Leonine Commission (Commissio leonina) is the group of scholars working on the ongoing project of critically editing the works of Aquinas.  The first superintendent of the commission was Tommaso Maria Zigliara, professor and rector of the Collegium Divi Thomae de Urbe (the future Pontifical University of Saint Thomas Aquinas). Its current seat is in Paris, rue de la Glacière  and it is currently (as of 2015) chaired by friar Adriano Oliva. The editions are published with  editions du Cerf, the historical Dominican publishing house in France founded in 1929 at the request of Pope Pius XI.

Aquinas' main work, the Summa Theologiae, was edited in nine volumes (tt.IV–XII) during 1888–1906.
As of 2014, the Editio Leonina comprises 39 volumes, representing about half of the entire scope of the project.

Bibliography
 t.I*-1. Expositio libri Peryermenias, editio altera retractata, [ed. R.-A. Gauthier ].  Roma - Paris,1989.
 t.I*-2.  Expositio libri Posteriorum, [ed. R.-A. Gauthier].  Roma - Paris, 1989.
t.II. Commentaria in octo libros Physicorum Aristotelis.  Roma, 1884.

t.III. In libros Aristotelis De caelo et mundo expositio, In libros Aristotelis Meteorologicorum expositio.,  Roma, 1886.
t.IV–XII. Summa Theologiae (with the commentaries by Thomas Cajetan). Roma, 1888–1906.  
t.XIII-XV. Summa contra Gentiles.   Roma, 1918–1930.
 t.XXI.  Quaestiones De potentia Dei, [ed. R.-A. Gauthier].  [forthcoming].
 t.XXII.1-3. Quaestiones disputatae De veritate, [ed. A. Dondaine]. Ed. Leon., Roma: Editori di san Tommaso, 1972-1976.
 t.XXIII.  Quaestiones disputatae De malo, [ed. P.-M. Gils]. Roma - Paris  1982.
 t.XXIV-1 Questiones disputate De anima, ed. B.-C. Bazán. Roma - Paris, 1996.
 t.XXIV-2, Quaestio disputata De spiritualibus creaturis, ed. J. COS.   Roma - Paris, 2000.
 t.XXV.1-2. Quaestiones de quolibet, [ed. R.-A. Gauthier], 1996.
 t.XXVI. Expositio super Iob ad litteram, [ed. A. Dondaine].   Romae [Ad Sanctae Sabinae], 1965.
 t.XXVIII. Expositio super Isaiam ad literam, [ed. H.F. Dondaine et L. Reid]. Romae [Ad Sanctae Sabinae]: Editori di San Tommaso, 1974.
t.XL. Opuscula, vol.I. Romae [Ad Sanctae Sabinae], 1969.
t.XLI, Opuscula, vol.II. Romae [Ad Sanctae Sabinae], 1970.
t.XLII Opuscula, vol.III. Roma: Editori di San Tommaso, 1979.
t.XLIII Opuscula, vol.IV. Roma: Editori di san Tommaso, 1976.
 t.XLVI. Sentencia libri Metaphysice, ed. J.P. Reilly.    (in preparation)
 t.XLV-1. Sentencia libri De anima, [ed. R.-A. Gauthier].   Roma - Paris, 1984.
 t.XLV-2. De memoria et reminiscencia, in Sentencia libri De sensu et sensato cuius secundus tractatus est De memoria et reminiscencia..., [ed. R.-A. Gauthier]. Roma - Paris, 1985.
t.XLVII.1-2.  Sententia libri Ethicorum, [ed. R.-A. Gauthier]. Romae [Ad Sanctae Sabinae], 1969.
t.XLVIII.  Sententia libri Politicorum, [edd H.F. Dondaine et L-J. Bataillon].  Romae [Ad Sanctae Sabinae], 1971, p.A.69-A.205.
t.XLVIII. Tabula libri Ethicorum, [ed. R.-A. Gauthier].   Romae [Ad Sanctae Sabinae], 1971, p.B.63-B.158.
t.L. Expositio libri Boetii De ebdomadibus, [edd L-J. Bataillon et C.A. Grassi]. Super Boetium De Trinitate, [ed. P.-M.J. Gils].  Roma - Paris, 1992.

See also
List of works by Thomas Aquinas

References

Concetta Luna, "L'édition léonine de saint Thomas d'Aquin", Revue des sciences philosophiques et théologiques 89 (1/2005) 31–110.
 "La Commission léonine: Philologie et histoire au service de la pensée", Revue des Sciences philosophiques et théologiques, Vrin, (2004).

External links
commissio-leonina.org
corpusthomisticum.org

Works by Thomas Aquinas
Pope Leo XIII
Series of books